Vyžuonos is a town in Utena County, Lithuania. According to the 2011 census, the town has a population of 512 people.

History
In July 1941, 67 Jews of the city were massacred by an Einsatzgruppen in Vyžuonos forest. There is a memorial at the location of the massacre.

References

External links
 http://www.vyzuonos.lt/

Towns in Lithuania
Towns in Utena County
Vilkomirsky Uyezd
Holocaust locations in Lithuania
Utena District Municipality